Mount F. L. Smith is a mountain,  high, standing  northeast of Mount Fox in the Queen Alexandra Range of Antarctica. It was discovered by the British Antarctic Expedition, 1907–09, and named for F.L. Smith, a London tobacconist who was a supporter of the expedition.

References 

Mountains of the Ross Dependency
Shackleton Coast